Scirpophaga aurivena is a moth in the family Crambidae. It was described by George Hampson in 1903. It is found in the Khasi Hills of north-eastern India.

The wingspan is 19–22 mm.

References

Moths described in 1903
Schoenobiinae
Moths of Asia